Kurtalan Ekspres is a Turkish Anatolian rock band that has worked with several famous lead singers, such as Cem Karaca, Cahit Berkay, Barış Manço. The band takes its name from a train named Kurtalan Express, which travels between Kurtalan and Haydarpaşa. Kurtalan Ekspres was founded by Barış Manço in 1971, and initially included Murat Ses, Erdinç Avcı, Fuat Güner, Celal Güven, Özkan Uğur and Ali Serdar. In the late-1970s Bahadır Akkuzu joined the group as the lead guitarist. After Barış Manço's death in 1999, the band began working with Cem Karaca. After Cem Karaca's death in 2004, Bahadır Akkuzu took over the vocals. Bahadır Akkuzu died of a heart attack in 2009.

Members 

Drums: Ali Serdar (1971), Nur Moray (1971-1976), Hüdai Özgüder (1971-1972), Engin Yörükoğlu (1972-1974, deceased in 2010), Caner Bora (1974-1988) Hüseyin Cebeci (1988-1995), Cihangir Akkuzu (1995-)

Bass Guitar: Özkan Uğur (1971, 1972-1974, 1976), Mithat Danışan (1971-1972, 1974-1976), Ahmet Güvenç (1976-1988, 1991-)

Tumba: Celal Güven (1971-1988)

Electric Guitar: Fuat Güner (1971-1972, 1978), Ohannes Kemer (1971-1974, 1975, 1976-1977, deceased in 2012), Nezih Cihanoğlu (1972), Kirkor Kalender (1972), Mustafa Sarışın (1974), Nurhan Özcan (1974), Samim Boztaş (1975), Fehimen Uğurdemir (1976, 1980), Özkan Uğur (1978-1985), Bahadır Akkuzu (1978-2009, deceased in 2009)

Flute: Erdinç Avcı (1971-1972), Oktay Aldoğan (1974-1982, deceased in 2014), Serdar Ertürk (1980-1988), Serdar Akatlar (1980-1983)

Keyboard: Murat Ses (1972-1974), Yalçın Gürbüz (1975), Kılıç Danışman (1976-1977, 1978-1980), Ömür Gidel (1978-1985), Nejat Tekdal (1980-1982), Jean Jacques Falaise (1985-1986), Ufuk Yıldırım (1988-1996), Garo Mafyan (1988-1992), Elif Turhan (1991), Eser Taşkıran (1995-)

Albums

Solo 

 3552 (2003)
 Göğe Selam (2011)
 Göğe Selam II (2014)

Barış Manço & Kurtalan Ekspres 

 Yeni Bir Gün (1979)
 Sözüm Meclisten Dışarı (1981)
 Estağfurullah... Ne Haddimize! (1983)

References

External links 
 Anatolian Rock.com profile
 Kurtalan Ekspres Myspace Page
 Dönence Live Performance

Turkish rock music groups
Musical groups established in 1971